An Empire Zone is an area of up to two non-contiguous miles, in which tax incentives are offered by the state of New York, under the Empire Zones Program. This program was designed to bring new businesses and jobs to the state.  In 1999, the New York State Economic Development Zones program became the Empire Zones program at the direction of Gov. George Pataki. Today there are 82 Empire Zones in New York, and 9,800 certified businesses operating within them.

Qualifying businesses within these zones can apply for these incentives:
Wage Tax Credit
Zone Capital Credit
New York State Sales Tax Refund
Real Property Tax Credit
Tax Reduction Credit

External links
 Empire State Development Empire Zones Page

Taxation in New York (state)
Special economic zones of the United States